Rajsko  is a village in the administrative district of Gmina Mstów, within Częstochowa County, Silesian Voivodeship, in southern Poland.

The village has a population of 33.

References

Rajsko